Cicindela asiatica is a species of ground beetle of the subfamily Cicindelinae. It is found in Armenia, Iran, Iraq, Syria, Turkmenistan, and Turkey.

References

asiatica
Beetles described in 1839
Beetles of Asia
Taxa named by Gaspard Auguste Brullé